The 2017 Slovak Open was a professional tennis tournament played on indoor hard courts. It was the 18th edition of the tournament which was part of the 2017 ATP Challenger Tour. It took place in Bratislava, Slovakia between 6 and 12 November 2017.

Singles main-draw entrants

Seeds

 1 Rankings are as of 30 October 2017.

Other entrants
The following players received wildcards into the singles main draw:
  Lukáš Klein
  Tomáš Líška
  Aleksandr Nedovyesov
  Patrik Néma

The following player received entry into the singles main draw using a protected ranking:
  Igor Sijsling

The following player received entry into the singles main draw as an alternate:
  Peđa Krstin

The following players received entry from the qualifying draw:
  Niels Desein
  Tom Farquharson
  Kamil Majchrzak
  Franko Škugor

The following player received entry as a lucky loser:
  Matteo Viola

Champions

Singles

 Lukáš Lacko def.  Marius Copil 6–4, 7–6(7–4).

Doubles

 Ken Skupski /  Neal Skupski def.  Sander Arends /  Antonio Šančić 5–7, 6–3, [10–8].

References

2017 ATP Challenger Tour
2017
2017 in Slovak tennis
November 2017 sports events in Europe